The Waterford Greenway, also known locally as the Déise Greenway, is a route on a former railway track in County Waterford, Ireland, used for cycling and hiking. It opened in March 2017, on what was originally the Mallow/Waterford railway line, and forms part of EuroVelo 1 route.

The Waterford Greenway features 11 bridges, three viaducts and a 400-metre tunnel and runs between the city of Waterford, Mount Congreve, Kilmeaden, Kilmacthomas, and Dungarvan, and passes along part of the Copper Coast. At 46 km, it is Ireland's longest greenway. The Waterford and Suir Valley Railway shares the route along the banks of River Suir.

In December 2017, it was announced that over 250,000 had used the new route since it opened in March.

Proposed extension 
In July 2020, funding was announced for a feasibility study to investigate extending the greenway towards Mallow along the former Waterford-Mallow railway line. This initial feasibility study is due to examine the possibility of an 38.5 kilometre extension between Dungarvan and Ballyduff near the border with County Cork.

In 2022, the possibility of linking the greenway with the Suir blueway and the under-construction Cork Greenway was examined.

See also 
 EuroVelo
 Irish greenways

References

External links 

 
 , A Local Campaign Group

Irish Greenways
Transport in County Waterford
Rail trails in the Republic of Ireland